Yuriy Eduardovich Dumchev (5 August 1958 – 10 February 2016) was a Russian track and field athlete for the Soviet Union, who set the world record in the men's discus throw on 29 May 1983 with a distance of 71.86 metres. He was born in Rossosh. That mark, surpassed by current record-holder Jürgen Schult in July 1986, is still the world record. A 1980 Olympian, Dumchev also represented the Soviet Union at the 1988 Summer Olympics in Seoul, South Korea, finishing in fourth place (66.42 m).

Since 1979, he acted in films (more than 50 films).

Dumchev died in Adler, Sochi on 10 February 2016, aged 57.

International competitions

References

External links 
 
 
 

1958 births
2016 deaths
People from Rossoshansky District
Soviet male discus throwers
Russian male discus throwers
Olympic athletes of the Soviet Union
Athletes (track and field) at the 1980 Summer Olympics
Athletes (track and field) at the 1988 Summer Olympics
World Athletics Championships athletes for the Soviet Union
Honoured Masters of Sport of the USSR
Soviet male actors
Russian male actors
Burials in Troyekurovskoye Cemetery
Friendship Games medalists in athletics